Vipin Handa (born October 28, 1958) is an Indian film director producer, industrialist and television personality from New Delhi, India. He has been anchoring shows on Indian television and runs his men's fashion label, Villa Appearances.

Biography
Handa was born and bred in Delhi. He did his schooling at the Delhi Public School and obtained his B. Com. (Hons) from the Shri Ram College of Commerce. Handa made his directorial debut with Uff Yeh Mohabbat starring debutants Abhishek Kapoor and Twinkle Khanna. Handa has also written lyrics for numerous movies with lyricist Rani Malik.
Handa has been absent from the media for a long time, and was last seen on Dastak, a television show where he presented the problems of the unfortunate such as rape victims, child sex workers and those suffering from medical negligence and old age. Dastak offered a telephone number with counselors to provide support to callers. After Dastak went off air, Handa launched Koshish Foundation, which provided education to unemployed adolescent girls all over India.

Handa is currently writing a book for Wisdom Tree, with 14 short stories in English and Hindi. He is also the advisory member of the Wisdom Tree panel. He writes for a weekly newspaper section called "Vipin Handa Speaks" and also runs his men's fashion brand called Villa Appearances, which are branched all over India. Handa is currently planning to open a branch of boutique hotels with his son, Jehan Handa.

Filmography
1996  Uff Yeh Mohabbat as Director

Television appearances

Awards

References

External links

Koshish Foundation
Official Website

1956 births
Living people
People from Delhi
Shri Ram College of Commerce alumni
Indian television talk show hosts
Delhi Public School alumni